John Lambert (1937 – January 11, 2016) was a naval illustrator and historian. He specialised in naval boats up to destroyer size. The information he presented, and his detailed drawings of warships and their weapons systems, were referenced from official naval and shipbuilder sources.

He has written over 350 magazine articles for Model Boats, Airfix Magazine, Scale Models, Model Shipwright, Interavia and Marine Modelling International.

Books

Allied Coastal Forces of World War II - by John Lambert and Al Ross
 Volume I : Fairmile designs and US Submarine Chasers, 1990, 
 Volume II : Vosper designs and US Elcos, 1993, 
 Volume III : British Power Boat Company, Camper and Nicholson designs (yet to be completed).

The Fairmile D Motor Torpedo Boat 
(Anatomy of the Ship series)
by John Lambert, 1985, 

The Submarine Alliance 
(Anatomy of the Ship series)
by John Lambert and David Hill, 1986, 

Flower Class Corvettes in World War II (Warship Perspective series)
by John Lambert and Alan Raven, 2000

See also
(Topics John Lambert has written extensively on)
 Fairmile Marine
 Vosper & Company
 Submarine chaser
 Electric Launch Company
 British Power Boat Company
 Fairmile D motor torpedo boat
 Flower-class corvette
 British Coastal Forces of World War Two

References 

1937 births
2016 deaths
Naval historians